Dmitry Yurievich Pirog (born 27 June 1980) is a Russian politician and former professional boxer. In boxing he competed from 2005 to 2012, and held the WBO middleweight title from 2010 to 2012. Although his career was cut short due to a debilitating back injury, he is one of the few professional boxers to win a world championship and retire undefeated.

Early life and amateur career
At the age of eight, Pirog was a keen chess player and won some tournaments in the town of Temryuk, Russia. However, he soon felt as though he was not getting enough activity from chess, and decided to seek a sport instead. At his local gym, he discovered boxing and began fighting as an amateur, having relocated to the city of Krasnodar. At the early stages of his amateur career he didn't have a trainer, instead he studied carefully VHS tapes of Sugar Ray Leonard and later Floyd Mayweather Jr., which affected his style heavily. In his amateur career, Pirog claims to have won 200 fights and lost 30, all of which prepared him for the professional ranks.

Professional career

Early career
Pirog made his professional debut on 29 July 2005, scoring a sixth-round technical knockout over fellow debutant Sasun Oganyan. On his fourth fight, he defeated Sergey Tatevosyan to become the Russian national middleweight champion. Tatevosyan was an experienced veteran and gave Pirog a tough fight, but Pirog's skills ultimately prevailed and he won a unanimous decision 98–91, 98–93, and 97–95. From late 2007 to early 2010, Pirog won many regional and international middleweight titles from both the WBC and WBO.

WBO middleweight champion
Pirog's first world title shot arrived on 31 July 2010, against fellow undefeated prospect Daniel Jacobs, with the vacant WBO middleweight title on the line. The belt had last belonged to Sergio Martínez, who was stripped due to not complying with the WBO's rules. Pirog came in as a relatively unknown contender to American audiences, while Jacobs had the overwhelming backing of manager Al Haymon and promoters Golden Boy, as well as a very high knockout percentage. Jacobs started the fight well and was ahead by 39–37 on all scorecards by round four. However, Pirog managed to hurt Jacobs with a right hand. In the fifth round of the fight, Pirog scored a major upset when he knocked Jacobs down with a hard right hand. Jacobs was unable to get back up and the referee waved off the fight, giving Pirog a knockout win and making him the new WBO middleweight champion. After the fight, Pirog said "After the second round, I knew I was good. I hurt him in the second and I knew I could come back and do it again."

Pirog's exposure to worldwide audiences grew overnight, as the fight took place on HBO pay-per-view as part of the undercard to Juan Manuel Márquez vs. Juan Díaz II. However, in his subsequent two years as champion, Pirog only managed to make three defences, the last of which took place on 1 May 2012. In this fight, Pirog scored a wide unanimous decision, with scores of 120–108, 119–109, and 117–111, against Nobuhiro Ishida.

Injury and retirement
On 25 August 2012, Pirog was stripped of his title by the WBO after choosing to fight WBA and IBO middleweight champion Gennady Golovkin instead of WBO interim champion Hassan N'Dam N'Jikam. During training for the Golovkin fight, Pirog suffered a serious back injury—a ruptured disc—which forced cancellation of the fight. Several comeback attempts by Pirog to face Golovkin on an HBO pay-per-view main event were thwarted by ongoing back problems, effectively forcing his premature retirement.

Personal life
Pirog is a diploma graduate of Kuban State University and holds a managerial boxing license. Some of the boxers he has managed include Fedor Papazov and Vasily Lepikhin. In 2010, Pirog was the vice president of the Professional Boxing Federation in the Southern Federal District of Russia.

Political career
In March 2017, Pirog replaced Alexander Metkin in the State Duma, the Russian lower house, representing governing party United Russia.

On 24 March 2022, the United States Treasury sanctioned him in response to the 2022 Russian invasion of Ukraine.

Professional boxing record

See also
List of middleweight boxing champions
List of WBO world champions
List of undefeated boxing world champions

References

External links

1980 births
World Boxing Organization champions
Living people
Russian male boxers
World middleweight boxing champions
Undefeated world boxing champions
People from Temryuksky District
Sportspeople from Krasnodar
Seventh convocation members of the State Duma (Russian Federation)
Eighth convocation members of the State Duma (Russian Federation)
Russian individuals subject to the U.S. Department of the Treasury sanctions